Myrmecia rubripes is an Australian ant which belongs to the genus Myrmecia. This species is native to Australia. Their distribution is mainly in Western Australia.

Average lengths for a worker is 19-21 millimetres. The head and thorax is in a black colour; antennae, and other features are mainly red. The mandibles are a yellow colour.

References

Myrmeciinae
Hymenoptera of Australia
Insects described in 1951
Insects of Australia